Loryma daganialis is a species of moth in the family Pyralidae. It was described by Hans Georg Amsel in 1956 and is found in Jordan.

References

Moths described in 1956
Pyralini
Moths of the Middle East